Nicole Belloubet (born 15 June 1955) is a French jurist and politician who served as Minister of Justice in the government of Prime Minister Édouard Philippe 21 June 2017 to 6 July 2020. A former member of the Socialist Party (PS), she was appointed by President Emmanuel Macron after the resignation of François Bayrou. Belloubet previously served on the Constitutional Council, following an appointment in 2013 by Jean-Pierre Bel, President of the Senate.

Early life and education
Belloubet was born to an engineer from a modest farming family and the manager of a small Parisian hotel.

Academic career
Belloubet began her career in teaching before becoming, at the age of 42, rector of the University of Limoges. She served in that office between 1997 and 2000 before becoming rector of the Academy of Toulouse until 2005. In 2005, she resigned from her post to protest against decisions made by the government of Prime Minister Jean-Pierre Raffarin which wanted to reduce the number of teachers, among other reforms.

Political career
Belloubet joined the Socialist Party (PS) in 1983.

From 2000 to 2005, Belloubet chaired the French government's Inter-Ministerial Steering Committee for the Promotion of Gender Equality in the Education System. In particular, she drafted reports on "the future of the lycée" (2002) and on "combating gender-based and sexual violence in schools" (2001). She has also written on secularism and co-education in schools.

In parallel to her teaching, Belloubet later pursued a career in local politics, in particular as first deputy to the Socialist Mayor of Toulouse, Pierre Cohen, between 2008 and 2010. In 2010, she became regional councillor for Midi-Pyrénées, of which she was also first vice-president.

On 12 February 2013, Belloubet was appointed by Jean-Pierre Bel, President of the Senate, to serve on the Constitutional Council for a nine-year term, succeeding Jacqueline de Guillenchmidt. She became the first woman professor of law appointed to the Constitutional Council, and the seventh female member of the institution.

As Minister of Justice, Belloubet's first major project was to steer through the legislative process two bills on public ethics that were meant to help clean up national politics after hard-fought debates over a clause scrapping lawmakers’ constituency funds, which critics argued encourage clientelism. Internationally, she made headlines in 2019 when she publicly rejected U.S. President Donald Trump’s call for European allies to repatriate hundreds of Islamic State fighters from Syria and instead announced that France would be taking back militants on a “case-by-case” basis.

In early 2020, the Mila affair erupted over a 16-year-old girl insulting Islam on social media and then receiving violent threats. Belloubet was scrutinised for having erroneously said that insulting religion is against "freedom of conscience" in French law. She later corrected herself on the matter.

Controversy
When she joined the government in June 2017, Belloubet omitted to declare part of her shares in several real estate assets, including a house in Aveyron and two apartments in Paris.

Personal life
Belloubet was married Pierre-Laurent Frier, professor of public law at the University of Paris 1 Pantheon-Sorbonne, until his death in 2005. The couple had three sons.

References

External links 
 Nicole Belloubet on the Constitutional Council website

1955 births
Living people
21st-century French politicians
French Ministers of Justice
Government ministers of France
Politicians from Paris
Socialist Party (France) politicians
Female justice ministers
Paris 2 Panthéon-Assas University alumni
Pantheon-Sorbonne University alumni
Academic staff of the University of Limoges
21st-century French women politicians